Valley Park is a town in Rogers County, Oklahoma, United States. The population was 77 at the 2010 census, up 221 percent from the figure of 24 recorded in 2000.

Geography
Valley Park is located at  (36.278341, -95.745151).

Demographics

As of the census of 2000, there were 24 people, 6 households, and 6 families residing in the town. The population density was 11.0 people per square mile (4.3/km2). There were 8 housing units at an average density of 3.7 per square mile (1.4/km2). The racial makeup of the town was 91.67% White, and 8.33% from two or more races.

There were 6 households, out of which 66.7% had children under the age of 18 living with them, 66.7% were married couples living together, 33.3% had a female householder with no husband present, and 0.0% were non-families. No households were made up of individuals, and none had someone living alone who was 65 years of age or older. The average household size was 4.00 and the average family size was 4.00.

In the town, the population was spread out, with 45.8% under the age of 18, 8.3% from 18 to 24, 33.3% from 25 to 44, 4.2% from 45 to 64, and 8.3% who were 65 years of age or older. The median age was 20 years. For every 100 females, there were 60.0 males. For every 100 females age 18 and over, there were 62.5 males.

The median income for a household in the town was $101,376, and the median income for a family was $101,376. Males had a median income of $0 versus $0 for females. The per capita income for the town was $25,280. There are 25.0% of families living below the poverty line and 30.0% of the population, including no under eighteens and 100.0% of those over 64.

References

Towns in Rogers County, Oklahoma
Towns in Oklahoma